The South Stradbroke Island (Indigenous: Minjerribah), colloquially South Straddie, is an island that lies within Moreton Bay in the Australian state of Queensland, south of Brisbane and forms the northern end of Gold Coast. The island is a locality within the City of Gold Coast.

The  by  sized island is the smaller one of the two Stradbroke Islands and lies very close to the mainland. The island has hundreds of wild wallabies that are usually human orientated. They are also well known for stealing bread from tents and cabins, and joining campers at their fires.

One of more than 360 islands within Moreton Bay, the southern end of South Stradbroke Island fronts the Broadwater, and the tip marks the Gold Coast Seaway, only a matter of metres from the mainland at Southport Spit.  In the northeast is Tipplers Passage which separates the island from many smaller islands within the bay closer to the mainland. The east coast borders the Coral Sea.

South Stradbroke Island consists mainly of sand dunes, remnant livistona rainforest and melaleuca wetlands. The island also has unique flora and fauna. The golden wallaby is endemic to the island and the agile wallaby, once more common to the region, has now retreated to the island.

History 
Even before its formation as a separate island in 1896 the lands and waters of what is now South Stradbroke were sacred to the Quandamooka people who had long inhabited Redland Bay islands. 

To the north the island is separated by the Jumpinpin Channel from the larger North Stradbroke Island.  Both islands were originally one island, Stradbroke Island. In September 1894, heavy seas drove aground the barque Cambus Wallace at a narrow isthmus roughly halfway down the island's length. Salvage activity (including the detonation of a cargo of explosives) weakened the sand dunes along the spit such that by the spring of 1896, storms and tides had created a permanent opening from Moreton Bay to the Coral Sea now known as Jumpinpin Channel. The new tidal channel caused large changes to the channels and islands within southern Moreton Bay. Coastal managers are concerned that eventually one day Jumpinpin may repair itself which may cause problems for tidal waterway management including fish stocks, dugong habitat, erosion and flooding.

Some land clearing for cattle grazing conducted in the early 20th century has occurred.  During the 1950 to 1960s sand mining was conducted at the northern ocean beach area but reserves were limited. From the 1870s onwards the island's inner shores were used as camp grounds for holders of oystering licences. A small township called Moondarewa with 156 surveyed lots, was established at the island's southern tip.  By 1953 the island's natural movement north had washed away most of the settlement. Also once located at the southern end was a small area of vine scrub rainforest that attracted significant bird-life.

In 2009, some filming was done on the island for the 2011 film The Chronicles of Narnia: The Voyage of the Dawn Treader.

Heritage listings 
South Stradbroke Island has a number of heritage-listed sites, including:

 Lot 50WD3686: Grave of Ben Frances Manager
 Dux Anchorage: Dux Hut.
 Canaipa Passage, Jumpinpin: Site of the wreck of the Cambus Wallace
 4 Island Street, Currigee: The Graves

Accommodation facilities
The island is a tourist destination. There are numerous campsites including an anchorage for the Southport Yacht Club and Dux Campsite, owned by The Southport School.  Tipplers was purchased by the Gold Coast City Council in 2009. Due to ongoing encroachment of the sand dunes, the Council-run Bedrooms Campsite was closed in 2013. The Council has three alternate campgrounds: Tipplers that accommodates up to 100 tents with gas BBQs, a children's play area, and a kiosk that has basic camping supplies including ice and firewood; and North and South Currigee that together accommodates up to 80 tents with access to BBQs, a children's play area, and a mini kiosk for basic camping supplies.
Couran Cove Island Resort is located on the north side of South Stradbroke Island Resort; located approximately forty minutes from Surfers Paradise, the Couran Cove Island Resort provides a range of quality accommodation options, fine dining and the opportunity to see native Australian animals in the forest. The resort was established by Ron Clarke and originally opened in 1998 as an eco-tourist resort.  While the resort is not marketed as such now it does incorporate a number of environmental design features and technologies. There are also several private house located at the southern end of the Island.

Recreation
An  conservation park provides access to native wildlife. The park is suitable for hiking and ocean fishing.

Other recreational activities include jet ski tours, tube rides, 4WD tours, and speed boat rides. These operate from the Couran Cove Island Resort and Tipplers Passage.

Education 
There are no schools on the island, but there are many schools on the mainland. However, accessing those schools would depend on the transport options available from the home location on the island. Distance education would be another option.

See also

List of islands of Queensland

References

Sources

External links

Islands of Moreton Bay
Surfing locations in Queensland
Suburbs of the Gold Coast, Queensland
Barrier islands
South Stradbroke Island
Localities in Queensland